Basketball, for the 2013 Island Games, took place at the Bermuda College. It took place from 13 to 18 July 2013.

Due to that only two island entities (Bermuda and Saaremaa) have entered their men's basketball squads to these Games, only the gold medal was awarded here. Bermuda won the gold medal here.

Medal Table

Results

References

Basketball
Basketball at the Island Games
2013 in basketball